Arthur Albert Link (May 24, 1914 – June 1, 2010)  was an American politician of the North Dakota Democratic Party, and later the Democratic-NPL. He served as a U.S. Representative from 1971 to 1973 and as the 27th Governor of North Dakota from 1973 to 1981.

Life and career
Link was born in Alexander, North Dakota. He attended the McKenzie County schools, and North Dakota Agricultural College. Link began a career as a farmer soon after his 1939 marriage, and became active in politics as a member of the local chapters of the National Farmers' Union and Nonpartisan League. He was elected to the North Dakota House of Representatives in 1946 as a Democrat. Link served for 14 years as the house's minority leader, and was speaker of the house from 1965 to 1967. He was also a member of the Randolph Township Board, 1942–1972; McKenzie County Welfare Board, 1948–1969; Randolph School Board, 1945–1963; county and State Farm Security Administration committee, 1941–1946; and delegate, North Dakota State conventions, 1964–1968.

In 1970, Link was persuaded to run for U.S. Congress from the western district of North Dakota to succeed Republican incumbent Thomas S. Kleppe, who ran unsuccessfully for the U.S. Senate. It was a job with little long-term security as by then it appeared certain the state would be reduced to a single congressional district after the census. He was narrowly elected as a Dem-NPLer to the Ninety-second Congress (January 3, 1971 – January 2, 1973) in a mild surprise. Link opted not to challenge the state's veteran incumbent (Republican Mark Andrews) for re-election in the new at-large district in 1972 and instead ran for Governor of North Dakota. Elected in 1972 and reelected in 1976, Link served from January 2, 1973, until January 6, 1981.

Link was well liked and well respected as a governor. Those of all political persuasions found common ground with him. Some considered him a social conservative who was staunchly anti-abortion, deeply religious and willing to stand for principle even when political wisdom dictated otherwise, vetoing a bill to lower the state minimum drinking age to 19 years and providing leadership against legalizing gambling in the state. Others viewed him as a moderate as he was also astute fiscally, managing to avoid raising taxes of one of the poorer states in the nation. Still others saw him as a progressive, since he was still able to maintain and grow an excellent education system with affordable universities and students who consistently achieve some of the top test scores in the United States.

He was nominated to run for a third term but narrowly lost re-election in 1980.

Later life
After his defeat for re-election, Link remained active in public life, leading a successful fight against a state lottery in 1984. He also remained a strong force for historical preservation and writing of local histories.  He and his wife Grace lived in Bismarck, North Dakota.

He is fondly remembered by North Dakotans and former North Dakotans, Dem-NPLers and Republicans alike as one of the best governors the state ever enjoyed. Though the Democratic-NPL has been able to elect only one governor since Link vacated the office in 1981, they managed to occupy all the seats in the state's federal congressional delegation from 1987 until January 2011, with every member therein having served during the Link Administration.

A movie was made of the Links' lives in 2008, entitled: "When the Landscape is Quiet Again".

Link died at St. Alexius Hospital on June 1, 2010, in Bismarck, just eight days after his 96th birthday. He was survived by his wife of 71 years, former First Lady of North Dakota Grace Link, with whom he had six children.

References

External links

 North Dakota Historical Society: Arthur Link

1914 births
2010 deaths
Democratic Party governors of North Dakota
American Lutherans
People from McKenzie County, North Dakota
North Dakota State University alumni
School board members in North Dakota
Speakers of the North Dakota House of Representatives
Democratic Party members of the United States House of Representatives from North Dakota
20th-century American politicians
20th-century Lutherans
Democratic Party members of the North Dakota House of Representatives